The committees of the 9th Supreme People's Assembly (9th SPA) were elected by the 1st Session of the 9th SPA on 26 May 1990. They were replaced on 6 September 1998 by the committees of the 10th Supreme People's Assembly.

Members

Bills Committee

Budget Committee

Foreign Affairs Committee

Reunification Policy Deliberation Committee

Qualifications Screening Committee

References

Citations

Bibliography
Books:
 

9th Supreme People's Assembly
1990 establishments in North Korea
1998 disestablishments in North Korea